The women's team competition of the archery events at the 2015 Pan American Games will be held between July 14 and 18 at the Varsity Stadium. The defending Pan American Games champions are Mexico.

Schedule
All times are Central Standard Time (UTC-6).

Results

Qualification

Elimination rounds

References

Archery at the 2015 Pan American Games